John Arthur Sleaver (August 18, 1934 in– November 19, 2001) was a Canadian professional ice hockey player who played 13 games in the National Hockey League with the Chicago Black Hawks between 1954 and 1957. The rest of his career, which lasted from 1954 to 1970, was spent in various minor leagues.

Playing career
While playing for the Sudbury Wolves in the Eastern Professional Hockey League, Sleaver was involved in an incident with a spectator in Trois-Rivières, Quebec on December 27, 1959. He was alleged to have swung his stick at fan Michel Beauchamp, who was hit on the wrist. A warrant was issued for Sleaver's arrest.  Four policemen were sent to the Wolves' dressing room after the game, but Sleaver had already changed and left. Provincial police stopped the Wolves' team bus on its way back to Sudbury, but Sleaver was not found aboard.

Career statistics

Regular season and playoffs

References

External links 
 

1934 births
2001 deaths
Buffalo Bisons (AHL) players
Canadian ice hockey centres
Chicago Blackhawks players
Columbus Checkers players
Denver Invaders players
Galt Black Hawks players
Ice hockey people from Ontario
North Bay Trappers (EPHL) players
Ontario Hockey Association Senior A League (1890–1979) players
Quebec Aces (QSHL) players
Providence Reds players
Springfield Indians players
Sportspeople from Greater Sudbury
Sudbury Wolves (EPHL) players
Trois-Rivières Lions (1955–1960) players
Vancouver Canucks (WHL) players
Victoria Maple Leafs players